Maureen Ann "Moe" Tucker (born August 26, 1944) is an American musician and singer-songwriter who was the drummer for the New York City-based rock band the Velvet Underground.  After they disbanded in the early 1970s, she left the music industry for a while, though her music career restarted in the 1980s, and continued into the 1990s.  She has released four solo albums, where she played most of the instruments herself (though with frequent guest appearances by her former Velvet Underground bandmates and others), and has periodically toured.  She was inducted into the Rock and Roll Hall of Fame in 1996 as a member of the Velvet Underground.

Early life
Maureen Tucker was born in Jackson Heights, Queens, New York City, and grew up in Levittown, New York in a middle-class Catholic family. Her father, James, was a housepainter and her mother, Margaret, was a clerical worker. She had an older brother, Jim, who was friends with Sterling Morrison, and a sister, Margo.

As a teenager Tucker was an avid fan of Babatunde Olatunji, whose music she first heard on Murray the K's radio show. Olatunji, along with Bo Diddley and the Rolling Stones, inspired her to become a musician. She began playing the drums in 1963, at age 19. Without any formal instruction, she learned by playing along with popular songs on a second-hand drum kit.

Career

The Velvet Underground 

When she was asked to join the Velvet Underground, Tucker had dropped out of Ithaca College and was working for IBM as a keypunch operator. The band's original percussionist, Angus Maclise, had left in November 1965 because he felt the band sold out when it took a paying gig. Tucker was drafted because Velvets guitarist Sterling Morrison remembered her as the younger sister of his high school friend, Jim, who played the drums. Tucker was frequently noted for her androgynous appearance. In spite of this, Tucker has said that she never experienced difficulties due to sexism during this time.

Tucker's style of playing was unconventional. She played standing up rather than seated (for easier access to the bass drum), using a simplified drum kit of tom toms, a snare drum and an upturned bass drum, playing with mallets rather than drumsticks. She rarely used cymbals; she claimed that since she felt the purpose of a drummer was simply to "keep time", cymbals were unnecessary for this purpose and drowned out the other instruments. Rock critic Robert Christgau said of Tucker, "Mo was a great drummer in a minimalist, limited, autodidactic way that I think changed musical history. She is where the punk notion of how the beat works begins."

Apart from drumming, Tucker sang co-lead vocals on three Velvet Underground songs: the acoustic guitar number "After Hours" and the experimental poetry track "The Murder Mystery", both from 1969's The Velvet Underground album, as well as "I'm Sticking with You", a song recorded in 1969 but left (officially) unreleased until it appeared on the 1985 outtakes compilation VU. Lou Reed said of "After Hours" that it was "so innocent and pure" that he could not possibly sing it himself. In the early days, Tucker also occasionally played the bass guitar during live gigs, an instrument that was usually played by the band's regular bassist John Cale. Morrison would normally play the bass if Cale was occupied with viola or keyboards, despite his lack of enthusiasm for playing the instrument. However, some songs had Reed and Morrison playing their usual guitars and Cale was occupied with viola or keyboards and as a result, nobody was on bass: two examples of this are "Heroin" and "Sister Ray".

Tucker temporarily left the group when she became pregnant with her first child, Kerry "Trucker" Tucker, in early 1970. Because of her pregnancy, Tucker was only able to play on a couple of outtakes for Loaded, which would become the band's fourth and final album with Lou Reed. Billy Yule, the younger and high-school-age brother of bassist Doug Yule, filled in the role of drummer for live performances and some of the songs on the album.

1970s and 1980s 

Tucker returned to the band in late 1970, by which time Reed had left the group and Doug Yule had assumed leadership. She toured North America (United States and Canada) and Europe (United Kingdom and the Netherlands) with the band during 1970 and 1971; shortly afterward, she quit the band and the music business altogether to raise a family.

Tucker moved to Phoenix, Arizona, in 1971, where she lived with her husband and children. While living in Phoenix, she played drums in the short-lived band Paris 1942 with Alan Bishop of the Sun City Girls. In the early 1980s, she divorced and relocated to Douglas, Georgia, where she was hired at a Wal-Mart distribution center. She quit the job in 1989 when she was asked to go on tour of Europe with the band Half Japanese.

1990s: Solo albums and Velvet Underground reunion 

Tucker started recording and touring again, releasing a number of albums on small, independent labels that feature her singing and playing guitar, fronting her own band. This band at times included former Velvets colleague Sterling Morrison. Tucker also participated in the 1993 Velvet Underground reunion, touring Europe and releasing the double album Live MCMXCIII.

Apart from releasing her own records, Tucker has made guest performances on a number of others' records, including producing Fire in the Sky (1992) for Half Japanese, whose guitarist, John Sluggett, plays drums on her own recordings. In Jeff Feuerzeig's documentary about Half Japanese, The Band That Would Be King, Tucker performs and is interviewed extensively. Also, she has appeared with Magnet and former Velvet Underground band members Lou Reed (New York) and John Cale (Walking on Locusts).

Tucker also played drums on and produced the album The Lives of Charles Douglas by indie rocker and novelist Charles Douglas (also known as Alex McAulay) in 1999.

She played bass drum, wrote songs, and sang with the New York/Memphis punk rock–delta blues fusion group the Kropotkins with Lorette Velvette and Dave Soldier, whom she met in John Cale's band, in 1999–2003, recording "Five Points Crawl".

2000s and onward 

In 2017 she played at the Grammy Salute to Music Legends awards ceremony. A band, amongst others, consisting
of John Cale, played two Velvet Underground classics "Sunday Morning" and "I'm Waiting For The Man". The Velvet
Underground was the recipient of the 2017 Merit Award.

In 2021, Tucker participated in Todd Haynes' documentary The Velvet Underground.

Personal life 
Tucker was married in the early 1970s, and divorced some time in the early 1980s. She has five children: Kerry, Keith, Austen, Kate, and Richard. Tucker lives in Douglas, Georgia, where she raised her family. In a 2010 interview, she said she had ceased making music several years prior, saying caring for her grandson was a "full-time job".

In April 2009, Tucker gave an interview at a Tea Party rally in Tifton, Georgia, to a WALB NBC news crew. She voiced support for the Tea Party movement and said she was "furious about the way we're being led towards socialism". On the official "Tea Party Patriots" website, Tucker stated: "I have come to believe (not just wonder) that Obama's plan is to destroy America from within."

Discography

Solo

Studio albums 
 Playin' Possum (1982)
 Life in Exile After Abdication (1989)
 I Spent a Week There the Other Night (1991)
 Dogs Under Stress (1994)

Live albums 

 Oh No, They're Recording This Show (1992)
 Moe Rocks Terrastock (2002)

Compilation albums  

 Waiting for My Men (1998)
 I Feel So Far Away: Anthology 1974–1998 (2012)

EPs 
 Another View (1985)
 Moejadkatebarry (1987)
 GRL-GRUP (1997)

Singles 
 "Modern Pop Classics" (1980)
 "Around and Around" (Chuck Berry) / "Will You Love Me Tomorrow?" (1981)
 "Hey Mersh!" (1989)
 "Too Shy" (1991)
 "I'm Sticking with You" / "After Hours" (2002)

With the Velvet Underground

Studio albums 

 The Velvet Underground & Nico (1967)
 White Light/White Heat (1968)
 The Velvet Underground (1969)

Live albums 

 1969: The Velvet Underground Live (1974 [1969])
 Live MCMXCIII (1993)
 Final V.U. 1971–1973 (live box set, 2001 [1971–1973])
 Bootleg Series Volume 1: The Quine Tapes (live, 2001 [1969])

Compilations 

 VU (outtakes compilation, 1985 [1968–1969])
 Another View (outtakes compilation, 1986 [1967–1969])
 Peel Slowly and See (box set, 1995 [1965–1970])
 Loaded (1997 [1969–1970])†

† Although Tucker did not appear on the original release of the band's 1970 album Loaded, a 1997 2CD re-issue by Rhino Records subtitled Fully Loaded Edition includes two late 1969/early 1970 demos, "I Found a Reason" and another take on "I'm Sticking with You", which feature her on drums and vocals, respectively.

With others 
With Charles Douglas (a.k.a. Alex McAulay)

Charles Douglas – "The Lives of Charles Douglas" (1999)

With the Kropotkins

 Five Points Crawl (2000)

With Lou Reed

 New York (1989)

With Half Japanese

 Fire in the Sky (1990)

With Charlie Pickett

 Route 33 (1986)

With Shotgun Rationale

 Who Do They Think They Are? (1992)
 Roller Coaster (1993)

With Bloodkin

 "Out of State Plates" (1999)

With Magnet

 "Don't be a Penguin" (1997)

With John Cale

 Antártida (1995)
 Walking on Locusts (1996)
 Eat/Kiss: Music for the Films by Andy Warhol (1997)

With the Raveonettes

 Pretty in Black (2005)

Band members 
 John Sluggett
 Sonny Vincent
 Victor DeLorenzo
 Hank Beckmeyer
 Tico Zamora
 Lance Cagle
 Daniel Hutchens

References

External links

 Discography

1944 births
Living people
American women drummers
American women singer-songwriters
American multi-instrumentalists
American rock drummers
American rock guitarists
American rock singers
American rock songwriters
American Roman Catholics
Singer-songwriters from New York (state)
People from Levittown, New York
Protopunk musicians
Tea Party movement activists
The Velvet Underground members
American rock bass guitarists
Tambourine players
Guitarists from New York (state)
20th-century American drummers
20th-century American guitarists
People associated with The Factory
20th-century American women guitarists
21st-century American women